Amir Khadir (born June 12, 1961) is a Canadian politician in the National Assembly of Quebec (MNA), Canada for the electoral district of Mercier, and the first male spokesperson for Québec solidaire, a sovereigntist and left-wing political party which was created by the merger of the Union des Forces Progressistes and Option Citoyenne, a feminist political movement, in February 2006.

On December 8, 2008, Khadir became the first, and at that time, only elected representative for Québec solidaire in the general election in Quebec. In 2012, Françoise David was elected in Gouin, making her the second elected representative for Québec solidaire.

Khadir served alongside David as Quebec solidaire's spokespersons and de facto leaders from the party's founding until November 2012, when he stepped down to allow the party to choose a new male co-spokesperson from outside the legislature in accordance with party statutes. "It's the logical next step. First, for a party that considers itself feminist, it would be fairly contradictory to finally have a female deputy of Françoise's quality in the National Assembly and not have her be the spokesperson," Khadir said.

Biography 

Khadir was born in Tehran, Iran in 1961 and emigrated to Canada at the age of ten. He was involved in many humanitarian organizations such as Médecins du Monde.

He studied physics at the undergraduate level at Université de Montréal and subsequently at the graduate level at McGill University. He then studied medicine at Université Laval.

A medical specialist in infectious microbiology, he practiced at the Centre hospitalier Pierre-Le-Gardeur in Lachenaie, a section of the city of Terrebonne. Khadir is a member of the Coalition des Médecins pour la Justice Sociale (Coalition of Doctors for Social Justice), which opposes the privatization of the Quebec health care system. He has led missions to Iraq, Afghanistan, and the Palestinian territories for Médecins du Monde, and until 2004 he presided over the administrative council of SUCO, which stands for Solidarité-Union-Coopération.

Khadir is married to Nimâ Machouf. They have three children named Daria, Yalda, and Leyli. During the 2012 Quebec student protests, Yalda, along with several other demonstrators, was arrested for blocking the Champlain Bridge on March 12 and the Jacques Cartier Bridge on May 15.

Activism

Khadir worked with the Yes side in the 1980 sovereignty referendum.

Khadir was a member of the Rassemblement pour une alternative politique (RAP) from its inception in 1997 and took part in the founding of the Union des Forces Progressistes in June 2002 and at one point was the spokesperson for the party.

In the fall of 2005, Khadir signed the Manifesto for a Québec based on solidarity.

In August 2010, Khadir was a signatory of an open letter to French President Nicolas Sarkozy urging that France pay almost $23-billion in slavery reparations to help Haiti rebuild following the 2010 Haiti earthquake.

Boycott of Le Marcheur

In December 2010, Khadir participated in protests organized by the Palestinian and Jewish Unity (PAJU) that were held outside the Boutique Le Marcheur, a shoe store in Montreal, because the store sells shoes made in Israel. The protesters stated that they would continue to demonstrate outside the store until it stops selling shoes made in Israel. The store's owners, Yves Archambault and Ginette Auger, dismissed the protest, stating that "No one no one is going to dictate to me what to sell." Archambault sharply criticized Khadir, stating that he found it "horrible" that his MNA representative was verbally inciting customers not to enter his store. Archambault responded that Israeli products constitute only 2% of his store's goods, but announced that he would not give in to the protesters' demands.

On February 9, 2011, a motion was brought forward in the Quebec National Assembly to condemn the boycott of Le Marcheur. Khadir was the sole MNA to vote against it and prevent its being debated (unanimity is required for such a motion to go to debate). Several members of the National Assembly's other three parties: François Bonnardel of the Action Démocratique du Québec, Parti Québécois MNA Martin Lemay and Liberal party member Lawrence Bergman subsequently visited the store to show their support and demonstrate their opposition to the boycott.

Khadir later defended his support for boycotts of Israeli products but insisted there had been a "terrible misunderstanding" between himself and Archambault. Khadir denied that he asked people not to enter the store but stated that he only informed customers about the boycott. Khadir subsequently claimed that he misunderstood the nature of the protest, despite the clear message on the pamphlet he held while taking part (the pamphlet said "Boycott Le Marcheur" and vowed to continue the campaign until the store stopped selling Israeli products). Khadir also stated that he now regrets taking part and that he wants people to boycott the products, not the merchant. In an email release, Khadir stated that "I would have hoped the owner would be sensitive to the ethical issues of business and would join the boycott, but that is not the case, which is his right."

Provincial politics

Along with fellow QS spokesperson Françoise David, Khadir was for some years one of the two most prominent members of Québec solidaire, a left-wing party whose province-wide support was 6.03 percent in the 2012 Quebec election.

He ran for a seat in the National Assembly of Quebec in the Montreal-based district of Mercier against Daniel Turp of the Parti Québécois in the 2003, 2007 and 2008 elections.

On his first attempt, he finished third with 18% of the vote under the Union des forces progressistes party line. During Khadir's second bid, the first as part of the newly formed Québec Solidaire, he placed second, with 29% of the vote.

In 2008, Khadir won the seat and became the first Québec Solidaire candidate elected. He garnered 39% of the vote. During that campaign, Khadir received the endorsement of Robert Perreault, a former PQ cabinet member who represented the district from 1994 to 2000.

A poll conducted for the newspapers Le Devoir and The Montreal Gazette in early December 2010, established that Khadir was the most popular politician in Quebec, with an approval rating of 45%.

Khadir retired from his seat effective as of the provincial general election on 1 October 2018.

Controversy and activism

CSIS Canadian Security Intelligence Service Investigation 
The Canadian Security Intelligence Service investigated Khadir and his family because of their support for the People's Mujahedin of Iran (PMOI), an organization that opposed the government of Ayatollah Khomeini and which faced fierce repression by the Iranian government.

Former People's Mujahedin of Iran Facilitator 
Khadir declared in an interview that he was very involved in People's Mujahedin of Iran, saying that "I was the main facilitator of the opponents of the mullah's regime," but that in the mid-1980s he took his distance from this organization because he disagreed with their "autocratic turn" and their support for violence against the Iranian government. The United States in 1997, The Council of the European Union in 2002, Canada in 2005, Iraq, and Iran have designated the PMOI a terrorist organization. On January 26, 2009, the Council of the European Union removed the PMOI from the EU terror list. The group said it was the outcome of a "seven-year-long legal and political battle".

Opposition to 2011 Royal tour
In a 2011 interview, Khadir expressed his opposition towards the use of tax dollars for an upcoming royal tour through Montreal and Quebec City by the newlywed Prince William, Duke of Cambridge, and Catherine, Duchess of Cambridge, referring to them as "parasites".

Criticism of the United States
Khadir has also expressed criticism of the Bush administration's policies, throwing his shoes at a picture of the president outside the U.S. Consulate at a protest in Montreal in December 2008. The event was supposed to symbolically replicate Muntadhar al-Zaidi's shoe throwing attempt at the President in Iraq. He and other protesters then headed to the Canadian Forces recruitment centre on Sainte Catherine Street and threw shoes at a photograph of American president George W. Bush. Khadir was accused of betraying the "dignity and responsibilities of a[n] MNA," though Khadir himself says his constituents expected nothing less.

Electoral record

* Result compared to Action démocratique

Earlier, in the federal election of 2000, Khadir ran as a Bloc Québécois candidate in the riding of Outremont. He received 28% of the vote and finished second against Liberal incumbent Martin Cauchon.

References

External links

 
 Québec Solidaire – Mercier riding website
 Québec Solidaire

Francophone Quebec people
Quebec political party leaders
Canadian socialists
Anti-globalization activists
Male feminists
Canadian microbiologists
Physicians from Quebec
Iranian emigrants to Canada
Université Laval alumni
McGill University Faculty of Science alumni
1961 births
Living people
Politicians from Tehran
Québec solidaire MNAs
Union des forces progressistes (Canada) politicians
Canadian politicians of Iranian descent
21st-century Canadian politicians